Ellsworth Township is one of the fourteen townships of Mahoning County, Ohio, United States. The 2010 census found 2,217 people in the township.

Geography
Located in the central part of the county, it borders the following townships:
Jackson Township - north
Austintown Township - northeast corner
Canfield Township - east
Green Township - southeast
Goshen Township - southwest
Berlin Township - west
Milton Township - northwest corner

No municipalities are located in Ellsworth Township, although the unincorporated community of Ellsworth lies at the center of the township.

Name and history
Ellsworth Township was established in 1810. Ellsworth is the name of a "prominent citizen of Connecticut".

It is the only Ellsworth Township statewide.

Government
The township is governed by a three-member board of trustees, who are elected in November of odd-numbered years to a four-year term beginning on the following January 1. Two are elected in the year after the presidential election and one is elected in the year before it. There is also an elected township fiscal officer, who serves a four-year term beginning on April 1 of the year after the election, which is held in November of the year before the presidential election. Vacancies in the fiscal officership or on the board of trustees are filled by the remaining trustees.

References

External links
Township website
County website

Townships in Mahoning County, Ohio
1810 establishments in Ohio
Populated places established in 1810
Townships in Ohio